Sharpe's Justice is a British television drama, the 13th of a series that follows the career of Richard Sharpe, a fictional British soldier during the Napoleonic Wars. Unlike most of the other instalments of the series, this episode was not based on a novel by Bernard Cornwell. A key scene in the story is based on the Peterloo Massacre of 1819, reset here to Keighley in Yorkshire, in 1814.

Plot

It is 1814. There is peace in Europe as a defeated Napoleon is sent into exile on the island of Elba. Major Sharpe is assigned to head the Scarsdale Yeomanry in his native Yorkshire, depriving him of a chance to settle the score with his adulterous wife Jane and her lover, Lord Rossendale.

Sharpe and Regimental Sergeant Major Harper are met on their arrival by Captain George Wickham, an officer in the Yeomanry. As he escorts them to town, they are ambushed and shot at. Sharpe pursues (but does not catch) one of the men, who turns out to be his close childhood friend, Matthew Truman.

Wickham takes Sharpe to meet Sir Willoughby Parfitt and Sir Percy Stanwyck, wealthy businessmen who own many cotton mills between them. Parfitt tells Sharpe about the post-war unrest. The discharge of men from the army has flooded England with unemployed workmen; the increased competition and a reduced demand for cotton gives Parfitt an excuse to lower wages. He is opposed by Truman, a rabble rouser who stirs up the discontented, poverty-stricken masses.

Meanwhile, the financially strapped Rossendale inherits an estate in neighbouring Lancashire. He had used his influence to get Sharpe posted as far from London as possible, but now has to relocate (with Jane) nearby. Both Rossendale and Jane speak with Sharpe separately, but nothing is resolved.

Dan Hagman, one of Sharpe's former riflemen, shows up looking for work, but turns down Sharpe's offer - nine years in uniform is enough for him. He becomes a follower of Truman.

When Sharpe hears of an illegal meeting, he orders his soldiers to tread gently, but Wickham deliberately disobeys his orders and incites a massacre; Truman gets away in the confusion. However, Wickham cleverly manages to place all the blame on Sharpe.

Sharpe visits Sally Bunting, a woman who had been kind to him in his childhood. From her, he learns that his mother is dead and also that Truman is his brother (or more likely half-brother). He arranges to meet with him at their mother's grave. Parfitt learns of it and sends Wickham to take them both. Sharpe, Harper and Hagman get away, but Truman is shot dead by Wickham.

While in hiding, Sharpe is warned by Lady Anne Camoynes that Parfitt and Wickham intend to secretly intercept and destroy a steam engine that Stanwyck is bringing in, in order to weaken his business rival. They intend to blame it on disaffected machine wreckers. Sharpe and his friends foil the scheme, catching Wickham red-handed. Sharpe uses this to blackmail Parfitt into clearing his name. In the end, Sharpe heads back to London, Harper to Ireland, while Hagman stays behind, having taken a liking to Sally.

Cast
 Sean Bean – Major Richard Sharpe
 Daragh O'Malley – Regimental Sergeant Major Patrick Harper
 Abigail Cruttenden – Jane Sharpe
 Caroline Langrishe – Lady Anne Camoynes
 Philip Glenister – Matt Truman
 John Tams – Rifleman Daniel Hagman
 Douglas Henshall – Captain George Wickham, namesake of a minor character with similar traits in Jane Austen's novel Pride and Prejudice
 Alexis Denisof – Lord Rossendale
 Tony Haygarth – Sir Willoughby Parfitt 
 Karen Meagher – Sally Bunting
 Philip Anthony – Sir Percy Stanwyck 
 Philip Martin Brown – Saunders
 Sean O'Kane – Lt. Fosdyke
 Henry Moxon – Whitbread
 Rita May – Mrs. Trent
 Richard Bremmer – Arnold
 Tony Aitken – Horse Guards Clerk
 Nick Conway – Sam West

External links
 
 Sharpe's Justice at SharpeFilm.com

1997 British television episodes
1990s historical films
1990s war films
Napoleonic Wars films
Justice
War television films
Films set in 1814
Films directed by Tom Clegg (director)